Yannis Tamtakos (1908 –  January 4, 2008) was a Greek political activist, initially of Trotskyism and in his later life, of Anarchism. Due to his political activity, he was chased by the Axis forces, Greek state and National Liberation Front (Greece). For quite a few years before his death, he was the oldest survivor among the active participants of the 1936 Thessaloniki strike.

Biography

Tamtakos took part in every workers' struggle in Thessaloniki, as a shoemaker, having been elected committee member (1926–1927) and a secretary (1928–1929) of the Union of the Shoe-makers of Thessaloniki. Later, he got active through the union of the unemployed. In 1931, while on the frontline of a demonstration of the unemployed, in Syntrivani Square in Thessaloniki, he was attacked by a group of policemen, led by the nephew of the Head of the Police; the former shot him in the cheek and the bullet cut his tongue. He didn't lose his ability to speak, thanks to sub-consequent surgeries.

Tamtakos and his comrades were persecuted by the German occupiers, the Security Battalions, but also from the antinazi forces. He managed to escape assassination efforts by National Liberation Front (Greece) quite a few times while he used several identities and nicknames during the period of the occupation and of the liberation of Greece.
In Dekemvriana he accused the forces of National Liberation Front, for doing a stalinist coup d etat.
In 1948 his political Trotskyist party was participated in second World Congress of Fourth International, and party representative was Cornelius Castoriadis.

Published material
His book "Memories of a life in the revolutionary movement", which was published in March 2003, contains transcripts of recorded self-biographic tellings, including references to historical and political events of the last century. Part of his personal diary has been published in 1995, in the "Alfa" newspaper.

Yannis Tamtakos was one of the main characters in the movie "Coursal", directed by Nikos Theodossiou.

References

1908 births
2008 deaths
Greek anarchists
Greek Trotskyists
Anarcho-communists
Anarcho-syndicalists
People from Foça
Emigrants from the Ottoman Empire to Greece